Not to be confused with the music from The Piano.

The Heart Asks Pleasure First is a fictional novel written by Karuna Ezara Parikh. It was published on September 21, 2020. It is the debut novel of Karuna Ezara Parikh.

Reception
The Femina wrote in a review "Thirteen years in the making (with a break in between) and then reworked upon totally, The Heart Asks Pleasure First reflects the evolution of the author’s evolution of the plot into something that evokes the deepest of emotions."

The Hindu wrote in a review "Parikh’s story explores a space where these two earnest young lovers come together trying to discover if it is possible to find a personal truth which is unaffected by the impersonal forces swirling outside their bubble — the forces of history, politics and old hatreds."

The Scroll wrote in a review "In short, The Heart Seeks Pleasure First is a novel that has potential, genuinely, and certainly fulfils it to an extent – but ultimately falls a little short of the mark."

References

2021 debut novels
2021 Indian novels
Picador (imprint) books